Caladenia attingens subsp. effusa, commonly known as granite mantis orchid, is a subspecies of orchid endemic to the south-west of Western Australia. It has a single erect, hairy leaf and one or two green, yellow and red flowers.

Description
The sides of the labellum have narrow teeth and there are four or more rows of crowded, red calli along its centre including near its tip. Flowering occurs from August to early October.

Taxonomy and naming
Caladenia attingens was first formally described in 2001 by Stephen Hopper and Andrew Phillip Brown and the description, including of two subspecies, was published in Nuytsia. In 2015, Andrew Brown and Garry Brockman described subspecies effusa which, before formal description, was known as Caladenia attingens subsp. 'granite'. The description of the new subspecies was published in a later edition of Nuytsia. The name effusa is from the Latin effusus, meaning "loose" or "spreading", alluding to the lateral sepals which spread outwards rather than being sickle-shaped as in the other two subspecies.

Distribution and habitat
The granite mantis spider orchid is found between Peak Charles and Balladonia in the Mallee biogeographic region where it grows in shallow soil on granite outcrops.

Conservation
Caladenia attingens subsp. effusa is classified as "not threatened" by the Western Australian Government Department of Parks and Wildlife.

References

attingens
Orchids of Western Australia
Endemic orchids of Australia
Plants described in 2001
Taxa named by Andrew Phillip Brown